Raffles City Chongqing is suite of eight buildings in Yuzhong District, Chongqing, China, developed by Singaporean real estate developer CapitaLand.

Raffles City Chongqing features a 300-metre-long horizontal skybridge called "Crystal" that connects the top of four of the skycrapers. The skybridge will be the second highest in the world after the Kingdom Centre. The entire project comprises eight towers with a total of 817,000 square metres of floor space. It was designed by Israeli-Canadian architect Moshe Safdie. It is one of the most expensive buildings built in China. It replaced the 32-story passenger terminal building and hotel built in 1996 and the Three Gorges Hotel demolished on August 30, 2012.

Timeline
Construction began around 2013.
As of February 2019, the structures had been completed and the interior was being finished.

Overview
Raffles City Chongqing consists of eight skyscrapers situated on a site covering 9.2 hectares, in Yuzhong District, at the tip of the peninsula where the Yangtze and Jialing Rivers meet.

Atop four of the 250-metre-tall towers is an enclosed skyway, called the Crystal. Two 350-metre-tall towers connect to them, each via a cantilever bridge. Two other 250-metre-tall towers are adjacent to these six.

The project will contain 1.12 million square metres of space, 817,000 square metres of which will be floor space and will include 150,000m² of offices and 1,400 residences, a hotel, a 235,000m² shopping mall, and landscaped grounds.

The buildings are reinforced concrete with concrete-encased steel columns and steel floor spanning. The height to tip is 354.5 metres with 79 above-ground floors and 3 below.

The Crystal
The Crystal is an enclosed 300-metre-long horizontal skyway that sits atop four of the buildings. It is 32.5m wide and 26.5m high. The Crystal will set a record for being the highest in the world linking the highest number of towers. The exterior consists of approximately 3,000 glass panels and nearly 5,000 aluminum panels. The Crystal was constructed in nine parts. Four were constructed on the top of the towers and the three middle parts were prefabricated and raised from the ground and installed.

Within the Crystal, there will be two swimming pools, restaurants, a gallery, gardens with trees, and a viewing site.

Design and recognition
The project was designed by architect Moshe Safdie. It was inspired by Chinese sailing vessels and is a tribute to Chongqing historical past as a maritime trading centre.

Raffles City Chongqing won the China Tall Building Innovation Award.

See also
 List of tallest buildings in Chongqing

References

External links

Architect's Raffles City Chongqing homepage
Developer's Raffles City Chongqing homepage

Yuzhong District
Buildings and structures under construction in China
CapitaLand
Moshe Safdie buildings
Shopping malls in Chongqing
Skyscraper hotels in Chongqing
Skyscraper office buildings in Chongqing
Skyscrapers in Chongqing